BigCommerce is a NASDAQ-listed ecommerce platform that provides software as a service services to retailers. The company’s platform includes online store creation, search engine optimization, hosting, and marketing and security from small to Enterprise sized businesses.

History
BigCommerce was founded in Sydney, Australia in 2009 by Australians Eddie Machaalani and Mitchell Harper, who met in an online chatroom in 2003. One year after meeting, Machaalani and Harper launched their first company, Interspire, which evolved into BigCommerce. The company opened its first United States office in Austin, Texas in 2009.

The company raised $15 million in Series A funding from General Catalyst Partners in July 2011.

In 2014, the company expanded its presence on the West Coast, opening a San Francisco office and hiring personnel from PayPal and Amazon. In 2015, BigCommerce acquired Zing, a checkout and inventory software startup. 

Brent Bellm, the former HomeAway  COO who led HomeAway through its IPO, replaced Machaalani and Harper as CEO in 2015.

BigCommerce partnered with Amazon in 2016 to provide its retailers with the capability to sync inventory across both channels. 

In 2019, the company opened its ecommerce platforms to legally-operating U.S.-based  CBD and hemp merchants.

In July 2020, BigCommerce filed for IPO. The company went public on August 5, 2020.

Services
BigCommerce provides software to businesses that helps them set up and manage online and mobile stores, handle payments and currency conversions. 

As of June 2020, BigCommerce served 60,000 online stores in 120 countries.

See also
 Comparison of shopping cart software

References

External links
 

Web applications
Online retailers of the United States
Internet properties established in 2009
Online services
Companies listed on the Nasdaq